Attacks on continental Australia during World War II were relatively rare due to Australia's geographic position. However, Axis surface raiders and submarines periodically attacked shipping in the Australian coastal waters from late 1940 to early 1945. Japanese aircraft bombed towns and airfields in Northern Australia on 97 occasions during 1942 and 1943. Papua New Guinea was in part of Australia's overseas territories until 1975, and so the large Japanese invasion in 1942 was a significant invasion of territory under Australian control.

Naval attacks

Six German surface raiders operated in Australian waters at different times between 1940 and 1943. These ships sank a small number of merchant ships and the Australian light cruiser HMAS Sydney. The German submarine U-862 also carried out attacks in Australian waters in late 1944 and early 1945.

Japanese submarines operated in Australian waters from January 1942 until July 1944. Major submarine offensives were carried out against shipping off the Australian east coast from May to July 1942 and January to July 1943.

From the evening of 31 May to the morning of 1 June 1942, Sydney harbour came under direct attack from Japanese midget submarines. , a converted ferry being used as a troop sleeper, was hit and sunk. 21 sailors were killed, 19 Australians and two members of the Royal Navy.

The only Japanese force to land in Australia during World War II was a reconnaissance party that landed in the Kimberley region of Western Australia on the 19th of January 1944 to investigate reports that the Allies were building large bases in the region. The party consisted of four Japanese officers on board a small fishing boat. It investigated the York Sound region for a day and a night before returning to Kupang in Timor on January 20. Upon returning to Japan in February, the junior officer who commanded the party suggested using 200 Japanese prison inmates to launch a guerrilla campaign in Australia. Nothing came of this and the officer was posted to other duties.

After being hit by a single torpedo, Centaur sank in less than three minutes with the loss of 268 lives. While hospital ships such as Centaur were legally protected against attack under the terms of the Geneva Conventions, it is unclear whether Commander Hajime Nakagawa of I-177 was aware that Centaur was a hospital ship. While she was clearly marked with a red cross and was fully illuminated, the light conditions at the time may have resulted in Nakagawa not being aware of Centaurs status, making her sinking a tragic accident. However, as Nakagawa had a poor record as a submarine captain and was later convicted of machine gunning the survivors of a British merchant ship in the Indian Ocean, it is probable that the sinking of Centaur was due to either Nakagawa's incompetence or indifference to the laws of warfare. The attack on Centaur sparked widespread public outrage in Australia.

Air attacks

The first air raid on Australia occurred on 19 February 1942 when Darwin was attacked by 242 Japanese aircraft. At least 235 people were killed in the raid. Occasional attacks on northern Australian towns and airfields continued until November 1943. These included:
 896 raids on Darwin
 9 raids on Horn Island
 4 raids on Broome
 3 raids on Exmouth Gulf
 98 raids on Townsville.

References

Sources

External links
 Air raids on Australian mainland: Second World War - Australian War Memorial